Ogygia Island is the 420 m long in west-east direction and 70 m wide rocky island separated by a 110 m wide passage from Hall Peninsula on the east side of Snow Island in the South Shetland Islands. Surface area 2 ha. It is part of the southwest coast of Ivaylo Cove. The area was visited by early 19th century sealers.

The feature is named after the mythical island Ogygia, home of the nymph Calypso.

Location
Bulgarian mapping in 2009 and 2017.

Maps
 L. Ivanov. Antarctica: Livingston Island and Greenwich, Robert, Snow and Smith Islands. Scale 1:120000 topographic map. Troyan: Manfred Wörner Foundation, 2010.  (First edition 2009. )
 L. Ivanov. Antarctica: Livingston Island and Smith Island. Scale 1:100000 topographic map. Manfred Wörner Foundation, 2017. 
 Antarctic Digital Database (ADD). Scale 1:250000 topographic map of Antarctica. Scientific Committee on Antarctic Research (SCAR). Since 1993, regularly upgraded and updated

See also
 List of Antarctic and subantarctic islands

Notes

References
 Ogygia Island. SCAR Composite Gazetteer of Antarctica
 Bulgarian Antarctic Gazetteer. Antarctic Place-names Commission. (details in Bulgarian, basic data in English)

External links
 Ogygia Island. Adjusted Copernix satellite image

Islands of the South Shetland Islands
Bulgaria and the Antarctic
Calypso (mythology)